

Seeli (literally "small lake") or Seelisbergsee is the lake on Seelisberg in Uri, Switzerland, that gives the place its name.

External links

Lakes of Switzerland
Lakes of the canton of Uri